Amauta ambatensis is a Neotropical moth in the Castniidae family. It is found in Ecuador.

References

Moths described in 1917
Castniidae